Louis Baes (15 June 1899 – 10 September 1992) was a Belgian footballer. He played in one match for the Belgium national football team in 1924.

References

External links
 

1899 births
1992 deaths
Belgian footballers
Belgium international footballers
Place of birth missing
Association football defenders
Belgian football managers
Cercle Brugge K.S.V. managers